The Geste Formation is a fossiliferous geologic formation of the Puna Plateau in the western Salta Province and northern Catamarca Province of the Argentine Northwest, northwestern Argentina.

The Geste Formation comprises red sandstones and conglomerates deposited in a fluvial to alluvial environment. The formation was initially dated to the Mustersan (Middle Eocene), but subsequent research proved the formation to date to the Late Eocene (Divisaderan in the SALMA classification, ranging approximately from 42 to 36 Ma.

The Geste Formation has provided a faunal assemblage of vertebrates unique for the Argentine Northwest, with several groups of mammals, most notably the only Paleogene interatheres of northwestern Argentina, reptiles and frogs. Only partly they correspond to other fossiliferous formations in the area; the upper part of the Lumbrera Formation and the Quebrada de los Colorados Formation.

Description 
The Geste Formation crops out in isolated patches on the Puna Plateau, stretching from the Salar de Arizaro in the north to the Colorado Ridge, southeast of the Salar de Antofalla in the south. covering the western part of Salta Province and the northern part of Catamarca Province. The most extensive outcrops of the formation occur between three volcanoes in the area; the Tebenquicho in the west, Cerro Ratones in the east and Hombre Muerto to the southeast. The formation was defined based on a type section of the Pastos Grandes Basin by Turner in 1960, 1961 and 1964. The formation comprises mainly coarsening upward sandstones, conglomerates and subordinate shales, deposited in a fluvial and alluvial environment. The Geste Formation is the lowermost unit of the Pastos Grandes Group and unconformably overlies different Paleozoic basements; the Late Ordovician Copalayo or Coquena Formation in the Pastos Grandes Basin, Ordovician Falda Ciénaga Formation in Antofagasta de la Sierra and Cordón del Gallego, Coquena Formation in the Sierra de Calalaste, or the Permian Patquía de la Cuesta Formation in the area surrounding the Antofalla volcano.

The small Pastos Grandes Basin was formed during the Incan orogeny in the Eocene. The Geste Formation is the only fossiliferous Paleogene formation cropping out in the Argentine Northwest. In the Pastos Grandes Basin, in outcrops located on the eastern flank of the Sierra de Copalayo in Salta Province, the Geste Formation was divided by Alonso (1992) into three members: lower, middle, and upper. The middle member contains fossils of vertebrates and represents deposition by medium-to-fast-flowing rivers, laying down the fine-to-medium-grained micaceous sandstones, grading into coarser sandstones towards the top of the middle member.

The sediments of the Geste Formation were sourced by the provenance area of the Oira Eruptive Complex, which formed a paleohigh between the Puna Plateau and the Calchaquí Valley where the contemporaneous Quebrada de los Colorados Formation was deposited.

The middle member of the formation has been dated at maximum 37.5 ± 0.1 and minimum 35.4 ± 1.5 Ma, corresponding to the Priabonian stage of the Eocene.

Paleoecology 
The paleoclimate of the time was much more humid than today, with elevated temperatures compared to the present-day climate and the area was at lower altitudes before the final phase of the Andean orogeny which did not take place before the Miocene. In this subtropical fluvial biome, a diverse fauna established, with fossils of various groups found in the formation. Several clades found in the Geste Formation have not been found elsewhere in northwestern Argentina. The fauna of the area is only partly overlapping with the upper Lumbrera Formation and that of the Quebrada de los Colorados Formation.

Paleontological significance 
The Geste Formation is an important Paleogene formation, as it is the only formation that has provided interathere fossils. The faunal assemblage comprises mammals of various groups, with notoungulates and armadillos dominating, reptiles (crocodiles, turtles and snakes not assigned to specific genera) and frog fossils.

Fossil content 
The formation has provided the following fossils:

See also 
 South American land mammal ages
 Guabirotuba Formation, contemporaneous fossiliferous formation of the Curitiba Basin, Brazil
 Seca Formation, contemporaneous fossiliferous formation of Ecuador
 La Meseta Formation, contemporaneous fossiliferous formation of Antarctica

References

Bibliography 
Geology
 
 
 
 

Paleontology
  
 
 
 
 
 
 
 
 
 

Geologic formations of Argentina
Eocene Series of South America
Paleogene Argentina
Priabonian Stage
Divisaderan
Sandstone formations
Conglomerate formations
Alluvial deposits
Fluvial deposits
Fossiliferous stratigraphic units of South America
Paleontology in Argentina
Formations
Formations